The Little Hearts Festival, was a three-day music festival held in Cape Town, South Africa, held between 5–7 December 2008 in aid of three children's charities: Cotland’s Baby Sanctuary, CHOC, and Red Cross War Memorial Children's Hospital. The festival featured the performances of twenty-four artists at the V&A Waterfront Amphitheatre.

Overview 
The Little Hearts Festival, was a three-day music festival held in Cape Town, South Africa, held between 5–7 December 2008 in aid of three children's charities: Cotland’s Baby Sanctuary, CHOC, and Red Cross War Memorial Children's Hospital. The festival featured the performances of twenty-four artists at the V&A Waterfront Amphitheatre.

The fundamental philosophy of the event was that all costs were absorbed by the organisers sponsors and artists directly so that the charities would receive full benefit of donations.

All total revenue derived from the event, not just "proceeds", was collected by the charities directly, in addition to over 3’000 toys collected for the children under the care of the charities. The toys were delivered to the children over the month of December 2008 as Christmas presents.

Location 
The festival was held at the open-air V&A Waterfront Amphitheatre, Cape Town, South Africa.

Organisation 
The festival was organised by Mark Schellhas and Melissa Rhode (through Schellhas' company, I Love Music Entertainment).
Sponsorships were provided by partners in media, transport and hospitality. The artists themselves sponsored their performances.
Transport logistics provided by Michael Eastman.

Sponsors 

The V&A Waterfront provided their Amphitheatre Stage, sound crew and security staff to the festival. Catering was supplied by the Waterfront Pick 'n Pay. Sound equipment was provided by Marshall Music, Cape Town. Avis supplied vans for transportation of the artists and toys. 1Time Airlines sponsored all flights and artists were accommodated by Village and Life and Protea Fire and Ice Hotels. Heart FM, Your LMG, Overtone, V&A Waterfront were the core media partners.

Artists & Schedule

Friday, 5 December 2008

Saturday, 6 December 2008

Sunday, 7 December 2008

References

External links 
 Official Little Hearts Festival Website
 I Love Music Entertainment Organisers Website
 Cotlands

Electronic music festivals in South Africa
Folk festivals in South Africa
Festivals in Cape Town